The 2008 Delaware lieutenant gubernatorial election was held on November 4, 2008, coinciding with the Delaware gubernatorial election. Democratic nominee and Delaware State Insurance Commissioner Matthew Denn was elected lieutenant governor over Republican nominee and former State Senator Charlie Copeland in a landslide, succeeding incumbent John Carney, also a Democrat, who instead opted to run for governor.

Candidates

Democratic Party
Matthew Denn, Delaware State Insurance Commissioner

Republican Party
Charlie Copeland, former Delaware State Senator

Blue Enigma Party
Peter Cullen
Cullen withdrew from the race on September 29, but still appeared on the ballot.

Polling

General election results

See also
 2008 Delaware gubernatorial election

References

2008
Delaware
Gubernatorial